Mesquite Airport  is a public use airport located two nautical miles (4 km) north of the central business district of Mesquite, in Clark County, Nevada, United States. It is owned by the City of Mesquite.

The National Plan of Integrated Airport Systems for 2011–2015 categorized it as a general aviation facility.

Facilities and aircraft 
Mesquite Airport covers an area of 155 acres (63 ha) at an elevation of 1,978 feet (603 m) above mean sea level. It has one runway designated 1/19 with an asphalt surface measuring 5,121 by 75 feet (1,561 x 23 m). It also has one helipad designated H1 with a concrete surface measuring 20 by 20 feet (6 x 6 m).

For the 12-month period ending January 31, 2011, the airport had 15,050 aircraft operations, an average of 41 per day: 99.7% general aviation and 0.3% military. At that time there were 22 aircraft based at this airport: 86% single-engine, 9% ultralight, and 5% jet.

See also 
 List of airports in Nevada

References

External links 
  from Nevada DOT
 Aerial image as of June 1994 from USGS The National Map
 

Airports in Clark County, Nevada
Buildings and structures in Mesquite, Nevada